Chaudeyrac is a commune in the Lozère department in southern France.

The small villages of Fouzillic and Fouzillac, 300 m from each other, are located on the territory of the commune. The villages are mentioned by Robert Louis Stevenson in Travels with a Donkey in the Cévennes. He was there on September 24–25, 1878, while on his way to Cheylard-l'Évêque. He refers to the villages as "Fouzilhic" and "Fouzilhac".

See also
Communes of the Lozère department

References

Communes of Lozère
Robert Louis Stevenson